William Boulton may refer to:

William Henry Boulton (1812–1874), lawyer and political figure in Canada West
William Boulton (engineer) (1825–1900), English engineer from Burslem, Staffordshire
William Henry Boulton (author) (1869–1964), English writer on assyriology
Sir William Boulton, 1st Baronet (1873–1949), British soldier and Conservative Party politician
Sir William Boulton, 3rd Baronet (1912–2010), British soldier and barrister
William Savage Boulton (1867–1954), English geologist, mining engineer, and water engineer

See also
Boulton (disambiguation)